The Estonian Air Force is the aviation branch of the Estonian Defence Forces. The air force traces its history to 1918, and was re-established in its current form in 1991.

As of 2016, the Estonian Air Force has a strength of 1,568 personnel. It operates unarmed aircraft and several radar systems. Its main tasks are to provide surveillance of Estonian air space and support the country's ground forces. In addition, the air force hosts units from other NATO countries at its single operational air base.

History

1918–1940

The roots of the current organization go back to the Russian revolution of February 1917, after which the Estonian state obtained a degree of autonomy within Russia, which included the establishment of national armed forces. Thus many Estonians in the Russian Army returned home to take up arms for their homeland. The Estonian Declaration of Independence in early 1918 was not recognized by Germany, which invaded and occupied the country during 1918. The Estonian armed forces were disbanded.

After the armistice on 11 November 1918, the Estonian Provisional Government immediately set about establishing a military aviation unit. On 21 November 1918 Voldemar Victor Riiberg, the Commander of the Engineering Battalion, assigned August Roos to organize a flight unit. The Aviation Company of the Engineer Battalion began to establish air bases near Tallinn for seaplanes and land planes, but it was not until January 1919 that the first operational aircraft was acquired – a captured Soviet Farman HF.30.

In the meantime, on 22 November 1918, the Soviet Red Army had attacked Estonia and soon occupied most of the country. The fledgling Estonian Army, with foreign assistance, managed to counter-attack in early January 1919 and went on to liberate the country by late February. It subsequently moved on to liberate Latvia. Aviation Company aircraft flew a limited number of missions in support of the army. Following the February 1920 peace treaty with the Soviet Russia, the Estonian Army was demobilized, but the Aviation Company was retained. With the delivery of more aircraft, it was reorganized as an Aviation Regiment, comprising a landplane squadron, seaplane squadron, flying school and workshops. More bases and seaplane stations were built.

Some Aviation Regiment pilots were involved in a pro-Soviet coup attempt on 1 December 1924, but this was crushed within hours. From 1925 the First World War era aircraft were gradually replaced by more modern types. During 1928 the Aviation Regiment came under the control of an Air Defence organization which included the Anti-Aircraft Artillery.

In 1939 the Estonian Air force consisted of about 80 active airplanes: Bristol Bulldog, Hawker Hart and Potez 25 biplanes from the 1920s, but also the more modern Avro Anson multipurpose aircraft, in three groups stationed at Rakvere, Tartu, and Tallinn. The Navy also maintained two multipurpose aircraft wings.

Plans to acquire Spitfires and Lysanders from Britain were thwarted when the outbreak of World War II in 1939 forced Britain to cancel all export orders. After the defeat of Poland, Estonia was forced to accept a Mutual Assistance Pact with the Soviet Union, signed on 28 September 1939. This allowed the Russians to establish military bases in Estonia, which were later used in the Winter War against Finland. On 17 June 1940 the three Baltic States were invaded by Soviet forces. During the June 1940 invasion the Air Defence took no action and subsequently aircraft remained locked in their hangars. The air force became the Aircraft Squadron of the 22nd Territorial Rifle Corps of the Red Army in the summer of 1940.

1991–present 

The Estonian Air Force was re-established on 16 December 1991 after the restoration of independence of the Republic of Estonia in 1991. The Air Force was slow to reform because the Soviets had damaged or destroyed most of their infrastructure before leaving.

The Air Force Command and Control Headquarters was formed in Tallinn on 13 April 1994. In February 1993 the German government donated two Let L-410UVPs transport aircraft. In October 1994 three Mi-2 helicopters were delivered, followed by four Mi-8s in November 1995. Initially tasked with ground-based, air surveillance and air defence using only old Soviet radars and AAA equipment, on 15 May 1997 the Air Force moved into the former Soviet Su-24 base at Ämari, south of Tallinn. In 1997–98 two of the Mi-8s were upgraded.

The Estonian Air Force has been rebuilding the military infrastructure left by the Soviet military. Most of the funds have been directed to the Ämari military airfield which was completed in 2011. The objective of developing Ämari Air Base is to cooperate with NATO and partner nations' air forces, and being able to supply standardized airfield and aircraft services necessary for Host Nation Support. Due to the lack of modern and developed military aviation infrastructure, the Air Force's development has been very slow.

Organization
One of the main goals of the Air Force is to build up an air surveillance system, which will be the cornerstone of the air traffic safety and airspace control. The second priority is the development of the Host Nation Support capabilities for air operations with further implementation of crucial peacetime Air Defence capability – Baltic Air Policing. One important milestone will be the development of the air surveillance system to the level, which allows close cooperation with the NATO air defence system. The purpose of Ämari Air Base is to work together with NATO and partner nations air forces and provide the standardized airfield and aircraft services to provide the Host Nation Services.

Structure and units 

 Estonian Air Force Headquarters
The Estonian Air Force Headquarters is highest command of the Estonian Air Forces and represents the military concept-developing, command and executive structure providing Air Forces peacetime, crisis and wartime leadership in order to reach, maintain and increase, as required, the operational level of the military subordinated structures so that to be able to operate under authorized commands responsible for military operations planning and conduct.

 Air Surveillance Wing
The Air Surveillance Wing (ASW) is located at Ämari Air Base and responsible for operating and maintaining the systems to monitor all air movements in Estonian air space. Its Air Operations Control Centre reports to the Baltic Air Surveillance Network's Regional Airspace Surveillance Coordination Centre (RASCC) in Karmėlava, Lithuania, which in turn reports to CAOC Uedem of NATO's Integrated Air and Missile Defence System.

 Ämari Air Base
Although the Estonian Air Force inherited a large number of former Soviet Air Force airfields in 1991 during the restoration of independence, most of them were disbanded within the early 90s due to non-existing need for such airfields. The Estonian Air Force has one active main air base in Ämari and occasionally uses a civilian airfield in Tallinn. The base houses the Base Operation Centre, Base Defence Operations Centre, a flight group, the Airfield Operations Group, Air Force Support Group and the Air Force Training Centre.

Current organization 
 Air Force Commander
 Air Force Headquarters, in Tallinn
 Air Surveillance Wing, at Ämari Air Base 
 Ämari Command and Reporting Centre, at Ämari Air Base, reports to the Baltic Air Surveillance Network's Regional Airspace Surveillance Coordination Centre, in Karmėlava in Lithuania
 Engineering and Technical Group, at Ämari Air Base
 Radar Station, in Levalõpme, with GM 403
 Radar Station, in Otepää, with GM 403
 Radar Station, in Kellavere, with AN/TPS-77(V)
 Airport Surveillance Radar at Ämari Air Base, with GCA-2020
 Ämari Air Base
 Flight Group
 Airfield Operations Group
 Air Force Support Group
 Air Base Operations Centre
 Air Base Defence Operations Centre
 Air Force Training Centre

Ranks and insignia

Equipment

The modern Estonian Air Force has been rebuilding devastated military infrastructure since 1994 when the last Russian Ground Forces units left Estonia. Most of the funds were directed to the Ämari military airfield which was completed in 2011. Due to the lack of modern and developed military aviation infrastructure the Estonian Air Force development has been very slow. All aircraft are unarmed. In addition to upgrading and modernizing Ämari military airfield, the Estonian Air Force has embarked on an extensive program to upgrade and modernize airspace surveillance, making a number of significant purchases in recent years.  The aim is to fully integrate with the NATO Integrated Air Defense System providing airspace surveillance with full national radar coverage and real-time reporting for the NATO Baltic Air Policing mission.

Aircraft 
 

Note : Three C-17 Globemaster III's are available through the Heavy Airlift Wing based in Hungary.

Radar

Air Force Commanders since 1994

See also 

Police and Border Guard Aviation Group

References

Bibliography 
 Gerdessen, Frederik. "Estonian Air Power 1918 – 1945". Air Enthusiast, No. 18, April – July 1982. pp. 61–76. .
 Gerdessen, Frederik; Kitvel, Toivo and Tilk, Johannes. "Aeg, mehed, lennukid" Tallinn: Eesti Entsüklopeediakirjastus 2001
 Humberstone, Richard. Estonian Air Force, 1918–1940 (Insignia Air Force Special No.3). London: Blue Rider Publishing, 1999.
 Kitvel, Toivo and Tilk, Johannes ""Eesti lennukroonika: tekste ja pilte aastani 1940" Tallinn: Aviopol 2003

 World aircraft information files Brightstar publishing file 329 sheet 9

External links 

 The official webpage of the Estonian Air Force

 
1918 establishments in Estonia
Military units and formations established in 1918
Military units and formations established in 1991
1991 establishments in Estonia